Marc Gisin (born 25 June 1988) is a Swiss former alpine skier. He competed in the 2018 Winter Olympics.

Career
Gisin represented Switzerland in the FIS ski championships.  Gisin's best results in the FIS World Cup came at Kitzbuhel in 2016 and 2018 where he finished in 5th position on both occasions. In the FIS European Cup, he won on three occasions at Madonna di Campiglio, Les Orres and Crans Montana.

Gisin competed in the 2018 Winter Olympics.  He finished in 21st position in the Men's Downhill race.

During his career, Gisin suffered major injuries in crashes. At Crans Montana in 2012, Gisin suffered a torn anterior cruciate ligament and then in January 2015 at Kitzbuhel left him with a concussion and bleeding on the brain after an accident during the Mens Super-G race.  In 2018, Gisin was involved in an accident at Val Gardena during the Mens Downhill race. He crashed following a jump, and was airlifted to hospital. Gisin was placed in a medical coma after the crash. He suffered bruising on the brain, a fractured pelvis and four fractured ribs.  In 2020, Gisin announced his retirement from ski racing.

Personal life
Gisin is the brother of alpine skiers Dominique Gisin and Michelle Gisin. During his career, Gisin was an athlete supported by Rossignol.

World Cup results
Top 10

References

External links
 
 

1988 births
Living people
Alpine skiers at the 2018 Winter Olympics
Swiss male alpine skiers
Olympic alpine skiers of Switzerland